Scott Murphy (1936 – 13 April 2006) was an American hematologist, medical researcher, and professor of medicine.

After secondary education at Episcopal Academy, he attended Yale University, graduating in 1958. He received his M.D. in 1962 from Columbia University College of Physicians and Surgeons. He was a medical intern from 1962 to 1963 at Boston's Peter Bent Brigham Hospital. From 1963 to 1965 Murphy was a U.S. Army captain stationed at San Francisco's Letterman Army Hospital. Discharged from the Army in 1965, he completed his medical residency at Peter Bent Brigham Hospital and then in 1966 became a research fellow in hematology at Presbyterian–University of Pennsylvania Medical Center.

In 1969 Murphy and Frank H. Gardner (1919–2013) demonstrated that room temperature of blood platelets is less deleterious than their refrigerated storage. Murphy and his colleagues developed and improved methods for collection, processing, and storage of blood platelets, thereby making blood transfusions safer and more efficacious.

In 1976 he left the University of Pennsylvania's School of Medicine. From 1976 to 1993 he was a member of Center City, Philadelphia's Cardeza Foundation for Hematology Research at Thomas Jefferson University. In 1993 he relocated upon being appointed the associate medical director of the Penn-Jersey Region, American Red Cross (Philadelphia). There he was appointed chief medical officer in 1994, retaining that post until his death in 2006 from malignant lymphoma. 

Murphy returned to the University of Pennsylvania's School of Medicine as an adjunct professor of medicine in 1999. Upon his death he was survived by his widow, a daughter, four sons, and ten grandchildren.

Awards and honors
 1998 — Karl Landsteiner Memorial Award, American Association of Blood Banks
 2005 — Charles R. Drew Award, American Red Cross

Selected publications
 with Frank H. Gardner: 
 with Frank A. Oski, J. Lawrence Naiman, Charles J. Lusch, Sheldon Goldberg, and Frank H. Gardner:  (See thrombocytopenia.)
 with Marie J. Stuart, Frank A. Oski, Audrey E. Evans, Milton H. Donaldson, and Frank H. Gardner: 
 with Marie J. Stuart and Frank A. Oski: 
 with John W. Adamson, Philip J. Fialkow, Jaroslav F. Prchal, and Laura Steinmann:  (See polycythemia vera.)

References

1936 births
2006 deaths
American hematologists
Episcopal Academy alumni
Yale University alumni
Columbia University Vagelos College of Physicians and Surgeons alumni
Deaths from lymphoma
People from Philadelphia